The Kenyan wattled bat (Glauconycteris kenyacola) is a species of vesper bat and a member of the family Vespertilionidae. It is found only in Kenya.

References

Endemic fauna of Kenya
Glauconycteris
Bats of Africa
Mammals described in 1982
Taxonomy articles created by Polbot